John Campsie Brown (4 July 1886 – 13 February 1950) was an Australian rules footballer who played with St Kilda in the Victorian Football League (VFL).

Notes

External links 

1886 births
1950 deaths
Australian rules footballers from Victoria (Australia)
St Kilda Football Club players